Electric Banana may refer to:
 Electric Banana, a pseudonym for the Pretty Things, a British rock music group.
 The Electric Banana, a nightclub in Pittsburgh, Pennsylvania.
 Electric Banana Band, a Swedish children's music group.